Fossil Culture is an album by Peter Frohmader and Richard Pinhas, released on September 22, 1999 through Cuneiform Records.

Track listing

Personnel 
Adapted from the Fossil Culture liner notes.
Musicians
Peter Frohmader – five-string bass guitar, E-mu Emulator, synthesizer, sampler, illustrations, production, mixing
Richard Pinhas – guitar, effects, production
Production and additional personnel
Bill Ellsworth – design, illustrations
Bernd Koller – mixing

Release history

References

External links 
 Fossil Culture at Discogs (list of releases)
 Fossil Culture at Bandcamp

1999 albums
Peter Frohmader albums
Collaborative albums
Cuneiform Records albums